The 2014 Ana Ivanovic tennis season officially began with the start of the 2014 ASB Classic event in Auckland and ended with the 2014 WTA Finals. Ivanovic entered the season as the number 16th ranked player and wasn't defending champion at any tournament.

However, during the season, Ivanovic reached second Australian Open quarterfinal after reaching final in 2008. In the fourth round she pulled off the biggest surprise by beating world No. 1 Serena Williams, who was clear favourite for the title and snapped Serena's 25 match winning streak all the way. Despite losing in early rounds of other three Grand Slams, Ivanovic had great season marked with the most WTA match wins of all players at 59 (officially 58, because WTA doesn't count matches in Fed Cup which are in lower round than World Group II, and Ivanovic won one match against Simona Halep in World Group II Play-offs), winning four titles and finishing the year as number five, her third top 10 season and first since 2008. It was the first time that she won 4 titles in a season and never won more matches in a season than this season. She also had 10 wins over top 10 ranked opponents during the season, the most she had after 2007 when she had 14 wins.

Year in details

Australian Open series

ASB Classic

Ivanovic started season playing in Auckland, ranked 16th and was seeded 2nd there. She rolled to her first final on outdoor courts since 2009 Indian Wells Masters, beating Alison Riske, Johanna Larsson, Kurumi Nara and Kirsten Flipkens all in straight sets. Ivanovic was on course for one more easy win when she was 6–2, 5–3 up against former No. 1 Venus Williams in final, but Venus then won four straight games to equal result. Ivanovic broke soon in third set, and closed out later third set with 6–4. This was her first title on outdoor courts since winning 2008 French Open, as all of her four titles in the span came in season-ending series on indoor hardcourts, and it was her first title since 2011 overall.

Australian Open

Coming to Australian Open with first title since 2011, Ivanovic looked as she brought good momentum from the first moment on. She was seeded 14th and was set in line for a clash with world No. 1 Serena Williams in fourth round, tough some though opponents were standing between that match. Against not high-ranked opponent Kiki Bertens at 93, but future Slam semifinalist, Ivanovic had though battle before eventually winning, as she broke in both sets when returning at 5–4. Next opponent was German Annika Beck, and despite of her much better rank placement than Bertens, Ivanovic lost just three games and it could be even easier as she was serving at 6–1, 5–0 but lost next two games.

In third round she played against 17th seed Samantha Stosur, who doesn't have much success at her home soil, but is always dangerous opponent as a former US Open champion. Stosur was even positive in their matches at 4–3. Ivanovic started badly, but from 3–5 and set point for Stosur, when line judges called double fault and Ivanovic had successful challenge, she continued a lot better, and despite losing eventually that set in a tiebreak, she lost just six games in next two sets.

She then set expected clash with Serena, who was on a roll with 25 match winning streak dating from August 2014. Ivanovic started better, breaking in fifth game of a match, but lost next service game at love. A few games later, and Ivanovic's sudden larger amount of unforced errors gifted Serena first set. But as the match continued, she became more and more confident in her service games and also put more pressure on Serena's, and soon she repeated first set, when breaking in fifth game. But this time she saved it in next game, then had a chance for one more break for 5–2, but however broke at even better moment for 6–3 in second set, because she then served first in decider. At 1–0 for Ivanovic in third set, she broke one more time at love, winning all four points with stunning returns. Players held their service games to the end of the match, which meant that Ivanovic eventually won, 4–6, 6–3, 6–3. It was the biggest surprise of the tournament, especially because of Serena's 4–0 record against Ivanovic before the match, and of course because of her great form, which allowed her opponents to beat her just 4 times in 2013.

However, despite that big win against Serena, Ivanovic looked already in next round as she had much more pressure of eventually winning title, and she succumbed to all of that when she lost to 30th seed Eugenie Bouchard in quarterfinals, though she was better in first set and won it, but from that moment Bouchard was leading every moment, breaking always first and eventually winning, 5–7, 7–5, 6–2. But in addition to her  pressure, double fault on a set point for Bouchard in second set says much itself. Despite heartbreaking loss, especially because of chance for winning title as there was no more Serena and Maria Sharapova in the draw, she had great tournament for the Slam, as it was her first Aussie quarterfinal since reaching final in 2008, and just second Slam quarterfinal overall since winning title at 2008 French Open.

Middle East Series

Qatar Total Open

At Qatar Total Open, she followed hard loss at Australian Open with first early exit of a season, as she lost in second round to Klára Zakopalová in three sets, after Daniela Hantuchová had retired in first round when Ivanovic rebounded from nearly lost first set.

Dubai Tennis Championships

Ivanovic was ranked 12th when Dubai Tennis Championships started, but wasn't seeded because nearly all top players came. That caused a clash in the first round against #8 Angelique Kerber. After losing the first set, she found a way to return, and in the end there was a lot of drama, as Ivanovic missed 3 match points on Kerber's serve at 6–5, and then from 5–2 in tiebreak for Ivanovic, Kerber took back both minibreaks, and then had match point herself. But Ivanovic won even three points in a row, and won 3–6, 6–3, 7–6(8–6). In next round she lost to wildcard Venus Williams, player whom she beat just a month ago in Auckland final, winning now just three games, which turned out to be the worst defeat of a season in terms of games won.

Spring hard court season

BNP Paribas Open

After receiving a bye in the first round of the BNP Paribas Open in Indian Wells as the 11th seed, she won against Elina Svitolina in three sets, coming back two times when Svitolina served for match in the third set, eventually winning in a tiebreak, tough that serves for the match were just part of players' constant breaks from 3–3 in the final set. In the third round she lost to another rising star, Sloane Stephens, in straight sets.

Sony Open Tennis

In Miami Ivanovic returned a bit from bad results from last three tournaments where she won one match and lost second, as she brushed aside Lauren Davis in second round losing just two games, and Flavia Pennetta, newly crowned Indian Wells champion, in third round. And despite being favorite in the fourth round against Petra Kvitová, she showed once again hot and cold performance, winning first set 6–3, but subsequently losing next two sets with a double bagel.

Monterrey Open

Coming to her second International tournament of the year at Monterrey Open, Ivanovic returned to winning ways by winning the second title of the year at same category, defeating Urszula Radwańska, Aleksandra Wozniak, 6th seed Magdaléna Rybáriková, 3rd seed and former No. 1 Caroline Wozniacki in semifinals, and Jovana Jakšić in first all-Serbian final.

Clay court season

Fed Cup

Fresh off her victory in Monterrey, Ivanovic flew a week later to Bucharest, Romania, for a Fed Cup World Group II Play-offs tie against Romania. Playing in a team without other high-profile players from Serbia, Jelena Janković, who hasn't played Fed Cup since they reached final in 2012, her team wasn't favourite against quite solid Romania's. In first match, she played against Sorana Cîrstea, and Sorana pulled off a big upset, winning in three sets. Playing now as a non-favorite against No. 5 Simona Halep, Ivanovic made upset herself, beating her in straight sets. However, as Bojana Jovanovski lost both her matches, they were relegated to the Europe/Africa Zone – Zonal Group I in 2015, for the first time since 2008.

This was Ivanovic's seventh straight year that she competed for Serbia's Fed Cup team, and eight overall.

Porsche Grand Prix Open

Playing at first clay court tournament in Stuttgart, Ivanovic reached quarterfinals for a second straight year, after two wins against Germans, an easy one over No. 14 Sabine Lisicki and hard-fought against wildcard Julia Görges, rallying from first set blowout where she won just one game. Ivanovic continued to show why is clay her best surface, as she beat two-time Slam champion Svetlana Kuznetsova and former No. 1 and current top 10 player at the moment, compatriot Jelena Janković. Being just one step far from winning blue Porsche prize, Ivanovic started very strong against two-time defending champion Maria Sharapova, as she cruised to 5–0 lead with three breaks. Despite having 40–30, she lost three games before eventually winning first set with 6–3. Breaking first again in the second set, she was close to a big lead when having a game point on 3–1, but double fault on that point looked as the key for the falldown which followed it, as she won just two more games to Sharapova's 11. If Ivanovic had won it, it would have been the first time in her career that she won back-to-back titles, as she won Monterrey Open previously, but however, these were even Ivanovic's first back-to-back finals.

Mutua Madrid Open

Ivanovic followed last year semifinals appearance at Mutua Madrid Open with another good one, reaching quarterfinals after comfortable wins over Madison Keys, Bojana Jovanovski and Anastasia Pavlyuchenkova. Average games per set which she lost in that three rounds was 2,66. She fell then to Simona Halep, losing in an hour and winning just four games.

Internazionali BNL d'Italia

Continuing to match good results on clay, Ivanovic repeated her best result in Rome - semifinals. First she beat Italian wildcard Karin Knapp with loss of just two games, before having to battle hard for victory over always dangerous Alizé Cornet. In third round she gave revenge from Stuttgart final loss to #7 Maria Sharapova, cruising past Stuttgart & Madrid champion, 6–1, 6–4. The win was significant for a whole host of reasons, but most significantly she became the first player other than Serena Williams to defeat Sharapova on clay since 2011, ended her winning streak in Rome (Sharapova was 47–3 on the surface and was undefeated in Rome since 2011) and was the only player to beat the Russian on clay that year. It was also the first time since the semifinals at the 2007 French Open that Ivanovic had defeated Sharapova. She then won in quarterfinals against clay court specialist Carla Suárez Navarro in three hard sets. In semifinals defending champion Serena Williams awaited. Despite it looked at the start like her win over Serena at Australian Open was coincidence, as she lost first set 6–1, she rebounded fast and showed that it was far from that, as she broke twice for 4–0 lead in second set, and eventually won it 6–3. However, bad start to the third set gave Serena same advantage in second set, and she won it again with 6–1. At the end of the tournament, Ivanovic was however the only player to take set off Williams.

French Open

Ivanovic came to French Open as one of the title contenders, mostly because of her recent great form on clay and not because of the rankings, as she was yet hanging one place from coming back to top 10. She was seeded 11th, her highest seed at Grand Slam since 2009 US Open, when she was the same seed. From the first moment she proved wherefore she was in that circle of favourites, as she cruised past promising rising star Caroline Garcia, losing just four games against the local French. She followed that with another straight sets victory against Elina Svitolina, player to whom she nearly lost a few months ago in Indian Wells. Next opponent was 23rd seed Lucie Šafářová. The player who beat Ivanovic five times in a row proved to be disadvantageous for Ivanovic, as she struggled throughout the whole match against the lefty and succeeded to win just three games per both sets.

Ivanovic ended up clay court season without a title, which was unfortunate for her as she would have titles on all three surfaces in a season for the first time, as she later won one title on grass with no problems. She put a solid 13–4 record on clay courts (excluding Fed Cup), the even bigger reason why she should have won a title on clay.

Grass court season

Aegon Classic

After disappointing French Open, Ivanovic came back strong to grass, winning her first grass court title ever at Aegon Classic, as the first seed. She brushed aside Mona Barthel, Lauren Davis, 6th seed Klára Zakopalová, ninth seed Shuai Zhang and Barbora Záhlavová-Strýcová in final. In all matches, she lost five or less games. Win over Strýcová was even more significant as she later reached Wimbledon quarterfinals with some big upsets. This was her first Premier title since 2008 Linz.

Wimbledon Championships

Quick work for Premier title on grass at Aegon Classic put Ivanovic again amongst the favourites for Grand Slam title at the Wimbledon Championships. She was again seeded 11th. In the first round, she played against French Open champion Francesca Schiavone and won in two though sets. In the next round, she avenged her 2008 Wimbledon Championships loss to Jie Zheng, as she was shocked then by wildcard Zheng when she was the reigning French Open champion and world No. 1. Now she beat her with few problems, all coming in the first set which she won 6–4, before giving a bagel to Zheng in the second set.

However, on the surface which proved to be her worst through the years, and where she won just her first title this season, grass court specialist and previous year finalist Sabine Lisicki beat her in the next round, giving her another early exit at the Slam, 'early' only because of all she showed throughout the season. Still, Ivanovic lost to the same players just four games in Stuttgart, a few months ago. And also the match showed that Ivanovic was in there all the time, but an early break in the third set turned out to be key as she was giving up over the time the match was closing out. Also, bad conditions played their role in the match, which caused the match to be played over 3 days over the Middle Sunday. First, bad light stopped the match on Saturday when momentum was on Lisicki's side, as she was leading 6–4, 1–1. They continued the match on Monday, and Ivanovic proved to be better one till the rain started, as she won four games and Lisicki one. Rain started to fall on the worst moment for Ivanovic, as she was putting pressure on Sabine's serve, going to deuce a few times before they stopped, and if she won it she would serve first in the third set. When they came back on court after long pause, instead of problems for Lisicki on serve which were before the rain, she blasted two service winners, which were important because she later served first in the decider, and she won eventually 7 of 9 games played in the third part against absent Ivanovic for final score of 6–4, 3–6, 6–1.

All of mentioned facts show that Ivanovic played this year with a lot of pressure at Slams opposite to comfort game at other tournaments, which caused two early exit at Slams and also a bad loss at Australian Open quarterfinals, where she played against inexperienced teenager, at the moment, Eugenie Bouchard, when winning was imperative.

US Open series

Bank of the West Classic

In favor of the facts about Ivanovic at the Grand Slams and beside them, soon came a revenge to Lisicki, in her very first match since Wimbledon at Bank of the West Classic, when she won in straight sets. In the next round she lost against Canadian teenager Carol Zhao, losing just two games. In first quarterfinals at Stanford tournament, she played for the third time in a season a three-set match against Serena Williams. Ivanovic won first set convincingly by losing just two games, but eventually lost.
Despite losing points, she returned to the world's top 10 for the first time since 2009 French Open as Victoria Azarenka lost more points than Ivanovic. Ironically, it was just Azarenka who replaced Ivanovic then back in 2009 in top 10.

Rogers Cup

At Rogers Cup, tournament where she was the youngest champion at the time, when she won in 2006, she didn't have such a great time, as she didn't follow convincing win over Timea Bacsinszky against Coco Vandeweghe in second round, where she missed a chance to close the match out in two tiebreak sets, but then lost next 6–4.

Western & Southern Open

Ivanovic rebounded back at Western & Southern Open, where she reached her first final of Premier Mandatory or Premier 5 since 2009 Indian Wells Masters. She won her first two matches easily against Sorana Cîrstea and Christina McHale, revenging Fed Cup loss to Cîrstea all the way. In next round she survived hard three-set match against Svetlana Kuznetsova, similar to their previous in Stuttgart. This time Kuznetsova even had a break in decider at 3–1, but after saving a few more crucial break points for Kuznetsova's double break, Ivanovic won five games in a row to close the match out. In quarterfinals she had better time against Elina Svitolina, losing five games and putting perfect head-to-head record against her at 5–0 and also 3–0 in a season.

Then in semifinals, Ivanovic was on course for even faster win when she was up 6–2, 4–0, when the match started to get likes of controversial one. When Sharapova was up a break point in that game, Ivanovic hit the line and Sharapova barely returned that ball into part of the net above even end of the doubles court. But as the line judge called out, main judge Felix Torralba immediately corrected it, but said to replay the point. Despite 'she was there' as he said, she hit the ball at the same time they called out and hit it far from Ana's side. Ivanovic even clenched her fist before knowing that they should replay the point, and then insisted that point was hers, but Torralba didn't change the decision. From that moment on Ivanovic looked so distracted and absent, as she hit ball weaker and totally lost her game which brought her massive lead. Despite managing to win one service game which propelled her to a 5–2 lead, it was all of her in the second set, as Sharapova won next five games and a total of 7 games to Ivanovic's 1 since that judge's decision. Ivanovic went to bathroom pause before the third set, and as the pause was getting longer, Sharapova asked the judge whether is she changing wardrobe or she's just on bathroom break. Soon after the third set began, after Ivanovic won first service game, in the middle of Sharapova's service game she started to clutch on herself and hardly walked to her seat ending in tears and then had a timeout - doctors checked they blood pressure to be precise. After that they continued match, and Sharapova then started to scream louder and louder and to scream very loud 'come on' after many points, even after Ivanovic's mistakes. After Sharapova held that game, series of breaks followed, as there was just one hold for both which caused Sharapova to serve for match at 5–4. She saved some break points, and then had two match points, but after missing second, she made two double faults in a row. Ivanovic then saved break point in her game, held it, and won a match on Sharapova's serve on second match point for 6–2, 5–7, 7–5 result. Epic match lasted 2 hours and 46 minutes, and Ivanovic was slightly better in nearly all categories, finishing match with 29 winners to 28, and 45 unforced errors to 51.

In the biggest final in five years, Ivanovic started good with break in the first game against Serena Williams, which she followed to a 3–1 lead. After missing 3 separated break opportunities for two breaks advantage, she lost 11 of the 13 subsequent games.

At the end, Ivanovic didn’t win any place at US Open Series as she finished 4th, though she needed just one more win at Rogers Cup which would double her points and propel her to 2nd place.

US Open

Ivanovic came to US Open as the eight seed, her first top 8 or even top 10 seeding at Slam since 2009 French Open where she was the same seed. She lost just three games against Alison Riske in first round but lost to Karolína Plíšková in the second round in straight sets.

Ivanovic showed for the third straight Slam how nerves can distract player at big stage, and this time she even lost to a player who never before reached third round at Slam.

Asian hard court swing

Toray Pan Pacific Open

Ivanovic returned to confidence again, beating four top players to win fourth title of the season. After receiving first round bye, she beat Victoria Azarenka, Lucie Šafářová (revenging French Open defeat and ending 5 straight matches win streak for Lucie in their matches), and two top ten players, Angelique Kerber who was top seed, and Caroline Wozniacki, second seed and reigning US Open finalist. She didn't drop set all tournament. By reaching final, she set personal best for most finals in a season with six, and by winning title for most titles in a season with four.

Wuhan Open

Having to play the day after winning Tokyo title in Wuhan, Ivanovic fell to fatigue and was forced to retired in second set against Anastasia Pavlyuchenkova.

China Open

After enough time to rest, Ivanovic came charged to Premier Mandatory event in Beijing, and moved confidently to quarterfinals after defeating US Open quarterfinalist Belinda Bencic, Romina Oprandi and Sabine Lisicki. There she was given a walkover from Simona Halep. In first Beijing semifinals she lost to Maria Sharapova, shockingly easy, after being bageled in first set and winning consolation four games in second set.

European indoors and WTA Finals

Generali Ladies Linz

Ivanovic came to Linz with good memories, as she is two time champion and one more time finalist. But soon after winning first match against Pauline Parmentier, she withdrew from tournament citing a hip injury.

WTA Finals

Ivanovic was drawn into Red Group at WTA Finals along with Serena Williams, Simona Halep and Eugenie Bouchard. First match was against Serena, and she lost for the fourth time in a season to her after her shock win over Serena in Melbourne. Though she lost in two sets, she had one moment in first set to regret when having a break point to serve for the set and missing the ball which Serena couldn't return. In next match she brushed aside Eugenie Bouchard, losing just four games. Ivanovic once again gave a revenge to Grand Slam loss, meaning that she beat all players to whom she lost at Slam ultimately in their next match, excluding Pliskova whom she didn't play against since loss at US Open.

In final Round Robin match against Simona Halep, Ivanovic needed to win in straight sets to reach semifinals, because both Serena and Halep had two wins and would have more sets then Ivanovic if she even wins in three sets. Ivanovic needed just two set win with no matter of score, because even in worst case (two tiebreaks), she would have had better game percentage than Serena. After Halep was close to crashing Ivanovic's hopes by leading 5–2 and serving, Ivanovic managed somehow to get back and won in tiebreak with 9–7. In second set Halep raced to 4–1, Ivanovic won next two games to get break back, but another break for Halep and hold at love definitely crashed her dreams of returning to WTA Finals semifinal for the first time since debut in 2007, though she had just one more appearance in 2008. However, at least Ivanovic managed to finish season with the won match, with score of 7–6(9–7), 3–6, 6–3.

This win was Ivanovic's 59th win at WTA Tour, record leading of all players in the season at the end of it, and which ensured Ivanovic finish at the 5th place at the WTA rankings. If she eventually lost the match she would finish at 7th place, giving even bigger importance to Ivanovic's win over Halep. It was Ivanovic's third top 10 finish, along with 2007 and 2008, tough all of that finishes were in the top 5.

All matches

Singles matches

Doubles matches

Exhibitions

The Energi Danmark Champions Battle

International Premier Tennis League

Tournament schedule

Singles schedule
Ivanovic's 2014 singles tournament schedule is as follows:

Doubles schedule

Ivanovic's 2013 doubles tournament schedule is as follows:

Yearly records

Head-to-head matchups

Ordered by percentage of wins, as of WTA Tour Championships

 Elina Svitolina 3–0
 Lauren Davis 2–0
 Angelique Kerber 2–0
 Svetlana Kuznetsova 2–0
 Alison Riske 2–0
 Caroline Wozniacki 2–0
 Victoria Azarenka 1–0
 Timea Bacsinszky 1–0
 Mona Barthel 1–0
 Annika Beck 1–0
 Belinda Bencic 1–0
 Kiki Bertens 1–0
 Alizé Cornet 1–0
 Kirsten Flipkens 1–0
 Caroline Garcia 1–0
 Julia Görges 1–0
 Daniela Hantuchová 1–0
 Jovana Jakšić 1–0
 Jelena Janković 1–0
 Bojana Jovanovski 1–0
 Madison Keys 1–0
 Karin Knapp 1–0
 Johanna Larsson 1–0
 Christina McHale 1–0
 Kurumi Nara 1–0
 Carla Suárez Navarro 1–0
 Romina Oprandi 1–0
 Pauline Parmentier 1–0
 Flavia Pennetta 1–0
 Urszula Radwańska 1–0
 Magdaléna Rybáriková 1–0
 Francesca Schiavone 1–0
 Samantha Stosur 1–0
 Aleksandra Wozniak 1–0
 Shuai Zhang 1–0
 Barbora Záhlavová-Strýcová 1–0
 Carol Zhao 1–0
 Jie Zheng 1–0
 Sabine Lisicki 3–1
 Simona Halep 2–1
 Maria Sharapova 2–2
 Eugenie Bouchard 1–1
 Sorana Cîrstea 1–1
 Anastasia Pavlyuchenkova 1–1
 Lucie Šafářová 1–1
 Venus Williams 1–1
 Klára Zakopalová 1–1
 Serena Williams 1–4
 Petra Kvitová 0–1
 Karolína Plíšková 0–1
 Sloane Stephens 0–1
 Coco Vandeweghe 0–1

Finals

Singles: 6 (4–2)

Earnings

	
 Figures in United States dollars (USD) unless noted.

Wins over Top 10s

References

Ivanovic, Ana
Ivanovic, Ana